Harold McGluwa is a South African politician serving as a Member of the Northern Cape Provincial Legislature since 2012. A member of the Democratic Alliance (DA), he has been its provincial leader in the Northern Cape since 2020. He was the DA's provincial chairperson from 2012 to 2020. He is also the party's chief whip in the legislature. McGluwa was the provincial head of the previous Independent Democrats (ID).

McGluwa's brother, Joe McGluwa, serves as a Member of Parliament for the DA and was also the party's provincial leader in the North West.

In 2020, McGluwa announced that he was a candidate for provincial leader of the DA. The provincial congress was held on 5 December 2020. McGluwa won the election, defeating Willie Aucamp and Fawzia Rhoda.

On 30 November 2021, McGluwa was elected as the new DA caucus leader in the provincial legislature.

References

External links
Mr Harold Mc Gluwa – People's Assembly
Profile : Mr Harold Mcgluwa – Northern Cape Provincial Legislature (NCPL

Living people
People from the Northern Cape
Democratic Alliance (South Africa) politicians
Members of the Northern Cape Provincial Legislature
Year of birth missing (living people)